Vetrano is a surname. Notable people with the surname include:

Candela Vetrano (born 1991), Argentine actress
Joe Vetrano (1918–1995), American football player
Karina Vetrano (1986–2016), American speech-language pathologist and murder victim
Stefano Vetrano, Italian politician